Richard Trivino (born 5 June 1977 in Paray-le-Monial, Saône-et-Loire) is a French former professional footballer who played as a goalkeeper.

He won the French League Cup in 2000 and played in the UEFA Cup with FC Gueugnon.

Honours
Gueugnon
 Coupe de la Ligue: 1999–2000

References

External links
 
 

1977 births
Living people
People from Paray-le-Monial
Sportspeople from Saône-et-Loire
French footballers
Footballers from Bourgogne-Franche-Comté
Association football goalkeepers
France under-21 international footballers
Ligue 1 players
Ligue 2 players
FC Gueugnon players
US Créteil-Lusitanos players
FC Metz players
US Boulogne players